Rabble may refer to:
 Hoi polloi, a negative term for the common people
 rabble.ca, a Canadian website
 An arrow in the arcade game Libble Rabble
 Rabble of Devilkin, characters in the Dungeons & Dragons roleplaying game
 Rabble Starkey, a novel
 The Rabble, a New Zealand music group
 An iron bar used in the manufacture of iron and steel